George Hammell Cook (January 5, 1818 – September 22, 1889) was the state geologist of New Jersey and vice president of Rutgers College. His geological survey of New Jersey became the predecessor for the U.S. Geological Survey.

Biography
He was born in Hanover Township, New Jersey, on January 5, 1818, to John Cook and Sarah Munn. He married Mary Halsey Thomas on March 23, 1846. He served as the principal of The Albany Academy in Albany, New York from 1850 to 1852.

He came to Rutgers in 1853 and was appointed professor of chemistry.  His teaching duties also included mathematics and theology. Among his first research projects was the chemical analysis of marl. This research led him to determine better places to mine marl, which led to his appointment as the assistant state geologist. He published a geological survey of New Jersey to replace the one made in 1840.

In 1864 he was appointed as the state geologist of New Jersey.

He had become a vice president of Rutgers College and was a fellow of the American Association for the Advancement of Science. He died on September 22, 1889, in New Brunswick, New Jersey.

Legacy
Cook College at Rutgers University was named after him, as is the George Hammell Cook Distinguished Alumni Award.

Timeline
1818 Born in Hanover, New Jersey, on January 18, 1818
1836 Surveyed Canajoharie and Catskill Railroad
1839 Graduated from the Rensselaer Polytechnic Institute
1839 Tutor at Rensselaer Polytechnic Institute
1842-1846 Senior Professor at Rensselaer Polytechnic Institute
1848 Professor of Math and Natural Philosophy at The Albany Academy
1848-1850 Glass-making in Albany, New York
1851-1853 Principal of The Albany Academy
1853 Chairman of Chemistry and Natural Sciences at Rutgers College
1864 Elected as a member to the American Philosophical Society
1864-1889 Vice President of Rutgers College
1864-1889 State Geologist of New Jersey
1872 Published first edition of Geology of New Jersey
1879 Appointed Director of the State Agricultural Experiment Station
1889 Died in New Brunswick, New Jersey, on September 22, 1889, due to heart failure

Publications

See also
 Demarest House – his Riverstede home at Rutgers

References

Further reading

External links

National Academy of Sciences Biographical Memoir

1818 births
1889 deaths
American chemists
American geologists
People from Hanover Township, New Jersey
Rutgers University faculty
Fellows of the American Association for the Advancement of Science
Rensselaer Polytechnic Institute alumni
Rensselaer Polytechnic Institute faculty
American school principals
Burials at Elmwood Cemetery (North Brunswick, New Jersey)